Masked rough-sided frog may refer to:

 Hylarana baramica, a frog in the family Ranidae found in Brunei, Indonesia (including Borneo, Java, Sumatra, and Bangka Island), Malaysia, Singapore, and the extreme south Thailand
 Hylarana laterimaculata, treated as a synonym of H. baramica by some authorities,  a frog in the family Ranidae native to the Malay Peninsula (southernmost Thailand, Malaysia, Singapore), Sarawak (Malaysia), and the Natuna Besar island of Indonesia in the South China Sea

Animal common name disambiguation pages